Shay Raviv (Yishay Rabinowicz) is a Los Angeles-based record producer, songwriter and music creative.

History
Shay started playing classical piano at the age of six and discovered electronic music at age 14. He became passionate about electronic music and started experimenting with synthesizers and samplers. By the time he was 16, he had a studio of his own. At age 17 shay signed a recording contract with BNE records, and recorded his first three albums as "Violet Vision" with Jonathan Dagan aka J.Viewz. With these albums, Shay became a well-known producer in the Israeli electronic music scene and abroad. BNE Records were a major producer of electronic music. Their two main acts were Infected Mushroom and Violet Vision. Early Violet Vision songs were released in over 40 compilations worldwide.

After pioneering the Israeli electronic music scene, Shay relocated to Los Angeles California, where he expanded his musical interests. Shay's music has been featured extensively on various media channels including popular TV shows like House Of Lies (showtime) and Eastwick (ABC). Film music include The Chicago 8 and many more.
His remixes have always kept him at the forefront of dance music culture. Highlights include work for Infected Mushroom and Jonathan Davis.
Recent musical material include songs with Miranda Lee-Richards, known for her work with The Brian Jonestown Massacre and  The Jesus And Mary Chain, as well as new tracks with the Electronica group Terry Poison. Shay's sound is deeply rooted in minimal electronics and often described as being emotional, personal and dark.

Discography (Partial)
This discography includes Shay Raviv's songwriting, composition, performance, production, music supervision, and remixes.

Singles/EPS

Remixes

Albums

Commercial Music

Film & TV Music

Music Supervision

References

External links
 Shay Raviv Official Website
 Facebook
 Youtube
 

1982 births
Living people
Israeli musicians
People from Haifa
Trip hop musicians